
This is a list of Native American archaeological sites on the National Register of Historic Places in Pennsylvania.

Historic sites in the United States qualify to be listed on the National Register of Historic Places by passing one or more of four different criteria; Criterion D permits the inclusion of proven and potential archaeological sites.  Approximately one hundred different sites in Pennsylvania are listed under this criterion, including both Native American and European sites.  This list includes all properties in Pennsylvania that qualify under Criterion D due to the presence of Native American artifacts.

Sites

See also
National Register of Historic Places listings in Pennsylvania
List of European archaeological sites on the National Register of Historic Places in Pennsylvania (i.e. European American)

References

External links
Pennsylvania Historical and Museum Commission

 Native American
Archaeological Sites On NRHP In Pennsylvania
Archaeological Sites On NRHP